Gdańsk Święty Wojciech is a former railway station in Gdańsk, Poland.

Lines crossing the station

Sw. Wojciech
Disused railway stations in Pomeranian Voivodeship